The term independent animation refers to animated shorts and feature films produced outside a major national animation industry.

Criteria 
A good portion of the work is viewed in animation festivals and private screen rooms along with schools that produce animation through instruction. The significance of independent animation is as important as studio fare.

United States 
In America, working independent animators included Mary Ellen Bute, John Whitney, Harry Everett Smith and Oskar Fischinger alongside earlier efforts of what would later become UPA.

In 1959, the first independent animated film to win an Oscar with John Hubley's Moonbird which was also produced by wife and collaborator Faith Hubley using limited animation to tell their own personal stories.

Jordan Belson, Robert Breer and Stan Vanderbeek made experimental animation during this time.

In the late 1960s, animator Ralph Bakshi and producer Steve Krantz founded Bakshi Productions, establishing the studio as an alternative to mainstream animation by producing animation his own way and accelerating the advancement of female and minority animators.  He also paid his employees a higher salary than any other studio at that time. In 1969, Ralph's Spot was founded as a division of Bakshi Productions to produce commercials for Coca-Cola and Max, the 2000-Year-Old Mouse, a series of educational shorts paid for by Encyclopædia Britannica. However, Bakshi was uninterested in the kind of animation he was producing, and wanted to produce something personal. Bakshi soon developed Heavy Traffic, a tale of inner-city street life. However, Krantz told Bakshi that studio executives would be unwilling to fund the film because of its content and Bakshi's lack of film experience. While browsing the East Side Book Store on St. Mark's Place, Bakshi came across a copy of R. Crumb's Fritz the Cat. Impressed by Crumb's sharp satire, Bakshi purchased the book and suggested to Krantz that it would work as a film.

Fritz the Cat (1972) was the first animated film to receive an X rating from the MPAA, and the highest grossing independent animated film of all time. Bakshi then simultaneously directed a number of animated films, starting with Heavy Traffic a year later. Ralph Bakshi became the first person in the animation industry since Walt Disney to have two financially successful films released back-to-back.

Alongside Bakshi came other independent animated features of this era (some made by former Disney animators) such as John David Wilson's Shinbone Alley (1971), Don Bluth's The Secret of NIMH (1982) and Jerry Rees's cult classic The Brave Little Toaster (1987).

Avant-garde animator Carmen D'Avino's Oscar-nominated Pianissimo (1963) was distributed by none other than Amos Vogel's legendary Cinema 16.

Other independent animators during this time included Charles Braverman, Gene Deitch,
Marv Newland, Fred Mogubgub, Fred Wolf and Will Vinton. The latter two would go on to win Academy Awards for Best Animated Short Film along with the works of the Hubleys and Ernest Pintoff starting in the late 1950s-early 1960s.

Notable award-winning films included Dale Case and Bob Mitchell's The Further Adventures of Uncle Sam (1970), Ted Petok's The Crunch Bird (1971), Frank Mouris's Frank Film (1973) and Jimmy Picker's Sundae in New York (1983).

Animation historians John Canemaker and Michael Sporn also made independent animation in New York, both earning Oscar nods for their work (only Canemaker won in 2005).

Other animators like Candy Kugel, Jeff Scher, Joanna Priestley, Kathy Rose, Suzan Pitt, Robert Swarthe, Vince Collins, Barrie Nelson, Eli Noyes, Sky David (aka Dennis Pies), Steve Segal, Mike Jittlov,
Paul Fierlinger, Adam Beckett, Lillian Schwartz, Larry Cuba and George Griffin also made experimental and personal animation during the mid- to late 1970s through the early- to mid-1980s.

In the 1970s, independent animator Sally Cruikshank (known for the 1975 cult short Quasi at the Quackadero alongside animated segments for Sesame Street) continued to explore independent and D.I.Y. distribution options, but were still largely met with rejection even though her work is now considered ground breaking.

Collections of independent films have been gathered for theatrical viewing, and video release, under such titles as the International Tournee of Animation (which existed between about 1965 and ended in the late 1990s), Spike and Mike's Classic Festival of Animation (1977 to 1990) and Spike and Mike's Sick and Twisted Festival of Animation since 1990. Contemporary independent animators, including Steven Subotnick, Bill Plympton, Don Hertzfeldt, Nina Paley and PES have also made work outside of the studio system.

Later independent animation 
Bill Kroyer's 1992 feature debut Ferngully: The Last Rainforest, featuring the voice of comedian Robin Williams as Batty, was also made independently (under his own studio Kroyer Films) as an Australian-American co-production later to be distributed by 20th Century Fox.

The rise of the Internet in the 1990s and 2000s saw an exponential increase in the production of independent animation which included personal independent works by Timothy Hittle, Janie Geiser, John R. Dilworth, Lewis Klahr and John Schnall. Personal computer power increased to the point where it was possible for a single person to produce an animated cartoon on a home computer, using software such as Flash, and distribute these short films over the World Wide Web. Independently produced Internet cartoons flourished as the popularity of the Web grew, and a number of strange, often hilarious short cartoons were produced for the Web.

In the late 1990s, an independent animated short film called The Spirit of Christmas was produced for under $2,000 by two artists, Matt Stone and Trey Parker.  This film was widely distributed on the Internet as a pirated cartoon, and its phenomenal popularity gave rise to the popular television animated series South Park. Limited 1990s bandwidth made streaming difficult, if not impossible. While some animators like Spümcø's John K. opted to use Flash, it still required a plug-in making it unviewable in many early web browsers. Other early online animators like M. Wartella opted to use the Animated GIF to overcome these limitations and create early web-based animation viewable through all browsers.

Continued success for independent animation occurred in the 2000s with animated shorts such as Making Fiends. Both shorts garnered enough support to be turned into full-length TV series, airing on Nicktoons Network and Big TV, respectively.

By the mid-to-late 2000s YouTube and the Internet and like-minded online video distribution, in addition to independent broadcasting sites that followed, proved to be a dominant form of independently distributed, broadcast, edited, and produced animation TV shows, anime, feature films, music videos, retro animation, commercials, trailers, original online animation content, and web exclusives (which would otherwise not stand a chance of seeing airtime on more normal and expensive forms of mainstream broadcasting on most television networks, which still continue to function on a more traditional distribution matrix). The Annoying Orange, which started off as a series of viral quasi-CGI animated comedy shorts on YouTube, quickly gained a cult following and an excess of 100 million views online. It is an example of an animated web series to transition between Internet and television distribution successfully, as an animated series on Cartoon Network.

Recent independent animations released on YouTube include the adult animated web series Helluva Boss, and pilots for Hazbin Hotel and Long Gone Gulch. While Helluva Boss and Hazbin Hotel are made by independent animator Vivienne Medrano, Long Gone Gulch was written and produced by Tara Billinger and Zach Bellissimo, who had worked on animations for Cartoon Network, Adult Swim, and Disney+. At the same time, the all-ages web series, Sherwood, also released all 12 episodes on YouTube Originals, made freely available in April 2020. 

Alternative comics artist turned animator Dash Shaw's Cryptozoo (2021) enjoyed critical success at the Sundance Film Festival to the point of winning the NEXT Innovator Award while it was also nominated for the John Cassavetes Award at the Independent Spirit Awards a year afterwards.

Representations 
LGBT representation in independent animation has increased over the years, as many series have featured LGBTQ characters. Eddsworld, in 2003, a British animated web series, began airing on Newgrounds, and on DeviantArt the following year. In 2006, it began airing on YouTube. The show featured Katya, a lesbian woman, and her girlfriend, Kim, who is bisexual. Kira Buckland voices both characters. Lizzy the Lezzy, which premiered on Myspace in 2006, included LGBTQ+ characters like Lizzy, a lesbian. Plum, a bisexual character, first appeared in the animated series, Bravest Warriors, a show which aired on Cartoon Hangover's YouTube channel from 2012 to 2018, as confirmed by her crushes and by writer Kate Leth.. The show was made by Adventure Time creator Pendleton Ward and featuring Ian Jones-Quartey, who voiced the character, Wallow, while he directed his own show, OK K.O.! Let's Be Heroes which featured multiple LGBTQ+ characters. Although Plum had a crush on Chris, kissing him multiple times during the show, she is also madly in love with her doppelganger as shown in the comics.

The Rooster Teeth animated web series, RWBY, which began in 2013, features lesbian characters, and a trans woman named May Marigold, voiced by Kdin Jenzen. Nomad of Nowhere, another RoosterTeeth show, released in 2018, featured a lesbian protagonist named Skout, who had a crush on Captain Toth, her superior. In addition, Hazbin Hotel, by Vivienne Medrano, centers around a bisexual princess of Hell named Charlie, with a girlfriend named Vaggie, with the series also featuring an asexual character named Alastor, and a gay pornstar named Angel Dust. Medrano's other series, Helluva Boss, featured various bisexual characters, such as demon named Moxxie, and a pansexual demon named Blitzo. 

My Pride: The Series, which premiered in February 2020 on YouTube, follows a "queer, disabled lioness" named Nothing who is trying to heal the world. Yssa Badiola of Recorded by Arizal hosted a RTX panel, on September 21, 2020, and stated that there would be LGBTQ characters if a full season was ordered. Nico Colaleo's animated web series, Too Loud, the first season which ran from July to August 2017, and the second season which aired from September to November 2019, includes an LGBTQ character. In the episode "Slumber Party Sneak-In," Desiree plots with her sister, Sara, to dress up as a girl in order to go to a slumber party. The rest of the girls find this out, then console her, accepting, and deciding they like her no matter whether she is a trans girl named Desiree or as a closeted boy. In September 2019, Colaleo later described the episode as important, described it as his favorite episode of the show's second season, and a "pro-transgender episode."

Angakusajaujuq: The Shaman's Apprentice (2020), featuring Canadian Inuit characters, won Best Independent Short Film at the Festival Stop Montreal.

African American animator/filmmaker Ayoka Chenzira is known for the 1984 satirical animated short Hair Piece: A Film for Nappyhead People, which was inducted into the National Film Registry in 2018.

Independent animation outside the United States

Germany 
One of the earliest feature-length animated films was The Adventures of Prince Achmed, made in 1926 by Lotte Reiniger, a German artist who made silhouette animation using intricate cut-out figures and back-lighting. She made another feature, Dr. Dolittle, in 1928.

The United Kingdom 
The BFI funded around thirty pieces of experimental animation between the mid-fifties to mid-nineties (notable examples: The Quay Brothers). Another major contributor to independent animation in Britain was Channel 4, which gained an international reputation as one of the most adventurous broadcasters of animation featuring works from Joanna Quinn (Girls' Night Out), Paul Barry (The Sandman), Mark Baker (The Village), Barry Purves (Next) and former National Film Board of Canada animator Paul Driessen (3 Misses).

Another British animated milestone, the 1978 adaptation of Watership Down by American filmmaker Martin Rosen, was also made independently as well.

France 
Examples of French independent efforts include René Laloux's Cannes-winning Fantastic Planet (1973) and	Jérémy Clapin's Annecy Film Festival winner I Lost My Body (2019).

Japan 
Kōji Yamamura, Masaaki Yuasa, Yoji Kuri and Kihachiro Kawamoto have been prominently acclaimed Japanese independent animators known for their artistic qualities.

Chile 
Pato Escala's 2014 debut short film, Bear Story, won the Academy Award for Best Animated Short. As a result, many animators such as Fernanda Frick (Here's the Plan), who worked on Bear Story, and Hugo Covarrubias (the Oscar-nominated Bestia) made their own animated shorts in Chile.

Czech Republic 
Michaela Pavlátová is known for making independent efforts such as the 2021 feature My Sunny Maad, which was nominated for the Golden Globe Award for Best Animated Feature Film.

Australia 
Independent animation from down under includes the works of acclaimed stop motion animator Adam Elliot, known for the Oscar winner Harvie Krumpet (2003) and his feature film Mary and Max (2009).

See also
Zagreb Film
Pannonia Film Studio
Norman McLaren- Scottish experimental animator who worked at the National Film Board of Canada
United Productions of America
Adult animation
Animated documentary
Soyuzmultfilm
Halas & Batchelor
Richard Williams-director of the independently produced The Thief and the Cobbler
Cartoon Saloon
Animation Show of Shows-showcase for both independent and mainstream animated shorts
International Tournée of Animation
The Animation Show
Spike and Mike's Festival of Animation
Laika Studios
Arthouse animation

References

External links
9 Essential Animated Indie Movies|IndieWire

 
History of animation